Eric Lofton (born March 6, 1993) is an American football offensive lineman for the Winnipeg Blue Bombers of the Canadian Football League (CFL). He played college football at Temple.

High school career
Raised in Lumberton, New Jersey, Lofton played offensive tackle and tight end for the Red Devils at Rancocas Valley High School. In addition to football, Lofton was also a member of the wrestling team.

College career
At Temple, Lofton redshirted the 2011 season. Over the next four years, he played in 37 games. He was named a first-team All-American Athletic Conference selection as a senior in 2015.

Lofton graduated with a degree in economics.

Professional career

Ottawa Redblacks
After graduation, Lofton had tryouts with several professional teams, including the Philadelphia Eagles, Philadelphia Soul, and the Montreal Alouettes. Before landing with a team, Lofton worked for Freedom Mortgage in South Jersey.

On February 27, 2017, Lofton was signed by the Ottawa Redblacks. He earned a roster spot with the team after making it out of training camp. In two seasons with Ottawa, Lofton saw action in four games, spending most of his time on the practice squad.

BC Lions
Lofton signed with the BC Lions on November 8, 2019. On June 8, 2019, Lofton was released before the start of season.

Edmonton Eskimos / Football Team
On July 8, 2019, Lofton was signed to the Edmonton Eskimos practice squad. Lofton appeared in two games during the 2019 season. He signed a contract extension with Edmonton on December 30, 2020. He was released on May 24, 2021.

References

External links
 Temple Owls bio
 Edmonton Football Team bio
 Football Archives bio

1993 births
Living people
Temple Owls football players
American players of Canadian football
Canadian football offensive linemen
Ottawa Redblacks players
BC Lions players
Edmonton Elks players
People from Lumberton Township, New Jersey
Players of American football from New Jersey
Sportspeople from Burlington County, New Jersey
Sportspeople from Sherwood Park
Rancocas Valley Regional High School alumni